Bhojpur Airport  is an airport serving Bhojpur, a town in the Bhojpur District in Province No. 1 in Nepal.

Facilities
This airport has helped the people of Bhojpur to connect with regional capital Biratnagar and National Capital Kathmandu.

Airlines and destinations

See also
List of airports in Nepal

References

External links
 

Airports in Nepal
Buildings and structures in Bhojpur District, Nepal